Stelios Andreou (born 24 July 2002) is a Cypriot professional footballer who plays as a centre back for Belgian First Division A club Charleroi and the Cyprus national team.

International career
He made his debut for Cyprus national football team on 27 March 2021 in a World Cup qualifier against Croatia.

Career statistics

References

2002 births
Living people
Sportspeople from Nicosia
Cypriot footballers
Association football defenders
Cyprus youth international footballers
Cyprus under-21 international footballers
Cyprus international footballers
Olympiakos Nicosia players
R. Charleroi S.C. players
Cypriot First Division players
Belgian Pro League players
Cypriot expatriate footballers
Expatriate footballers in Belgium
Cypriot expatriate sportspeople in Belgium